is a high school in the city of Akita, Akita Prefecture, Japan. Akita High is the oldest and first high school in the prefecture and one of the earliest pre-World War II middle schools in Japan.

School activities

Athletics

Baseball
Runners-up,  Japanese High School Baseball Championship in 1915.

Basketball 
Won Japanese championship in 1936.

Mountaineering
3-time runners-up,  Inter-High School Championships

Judo
Japanese champions in 1931, runners-up in 1938.

Kendo
2-time Japanese champions in 1967 and 1968.

Notable alumni
Shigeki Abe - baseball player
Yasushi Akashi -  United Nations administrator.
Sasagu Arai - researcher of early Christianity
Shirō Fukai - composer
Kenzo Futaki - doctor
Eiji Gotō -  admiral
Mitsutaka Goto- baseball player
Hiroo Ishii - baseball player
Shun-ichi Iwasaki - engineer
Katsutoshi Kaneda - politician 
Kazuo Koike -  manga writer 
Machida Chūji - politician
Kazuo Nakamura (basketball) - head coach
Shōji Nishimura - admiral
Hitoshi Okuda - manga artist
Taro Shoji - singer
Sukenari Yokoyama - politician

Gallery

References

External links
Alumni Association
School song

High schools in Akita Prefecture
Education in Akita Prefecture
Educational institutions established in 1873
1873 establishments in Japan
Schools in Akita Prefecture
Buildings and structures in Akita (city)